Various newspapers, organisations and individuals endorsed parties or individual candidates for the 2019 United Kingdom general election.

Endorsements for parties

Newspapers and magazines

National daily newspapers

National Sunday newspapers

National weekly newspapers

National political magazines

Other national publications

Northern Irish newspapers

Regional newspapers

Individuals

Brexit Party 
 Derek Chisora, boxer

Conservative Party 

 Ian Austin, former independent and Labour MP
Arron Banks, businessman and co-founder of Leave.EU
 Gareth Bennett, independent and former UKIP AM 
 Carl Benjamin, YouTuber and former UKIP candidate
 Catherine Blaiklock, founder and former leader of the Brexit Party
 Roy Chubby Brown, stand-up comedian
 Douglas Carswell, former independent, UKIP and Conservative MP
 Bill Etheridge, former UKIP and Brexit Party MEP
 Lance Forman, independent and former Brexit Party MEP
 Bobby George, darts player
 David Goodhart, journalist
 Darren Grimes, commentator and activist
 Lucy Harris, independent and former Brexit Party MEP
 Tom Harris, former Labour MP
 Katie Hopkins, media personality and columnist
 Bernard Ingham, journalist
 Claude Littner, business executive
 John Longworth, independent and former Brexit Party MEP and chairman of Leave Means Leave
 Tim Martin, businessman and founder of Wetherspoons
 Geoff Norcott, comedian
 Annunziata Rees-Mogg, independent and former Brexit Party MEP
 Tommy Robinson, far-right activist and co-founder of the English Defence League
 Tim Stanley, journalist and historian
 Gisela Stuart, former Labour MP, chair of Change Britain and former chair of Vote Leave
 Alan Sugar, business magnate, media personality and former Labour Peer, now a crossbench peer
 John Woodcock, former independent and Labour MP
 Vladimir Zhirinovsky, Russian politician and leader of the Liberal Democratic Party of Russia

Green Party 

 John Cleese, actor and comedian
 Richard Dawkins, ethologist, evolutionary biologist, and author (also endorsed the Liberal Democrats, SNP, and Plaid Cymru)
 Hugh Fearnley-Whittingstall, celebrity chef, television personality, journalist and food writer
 Liam Gallagher, musician and songwriter
 George Monbiot, writer and political activist (also endorsed Labour)

Labour Party  

 Lawrence Abu Hamdan, contemporary artist
 Lolly Adefope, comedian
 Akala, rapper
 Lily Allen, singer-songwriter
 Gar Alperovitz, American historian and economist
 Amir Amirani, director
 Li Andersson, Finnish politician and Minister for Education
 Ulla Andersson, Swedish politician
 Adjoa Andoh, actor
 Kehinde Andrews, academic
 Katherine Angel, academic and writer
 Keith Armstrong, author and poet
 Oreet Ashery, artist
 Katy B, singer-songwriter
 Danny Baker, radio DJ
 Ronan Bennett, writer
 Big Narstie, musician
 Lethal Bizzle, rapper
 Grace Blakeley, author and economics commentator
 David Blanchflower, economist
 David Blandy, artist
 Mark Blyth, economist<ref name="FTecon"> (paywall). 'Economists' letter to the Financial Times''' also available here.</ref>
 Billy Bragg, singer-songwriter and activist
 Sam Byers, novelist
 Victoria Chick, economist
 Diana Chire, artist and director
 Noam Chomsky, linguist and philosopher
 Julie Christie, actress and activist
 Chipo Chung, actress
 Joan Collins, Irish politician
 Andy Croft, writer, editor and poet
 Caryl Churchill, playwright
 Jasmina Cibic, performance, installation and film artist
 Steve Coogan, comedian and actor (not in all constituencies)
 Christine Cooper, economist
 Rafael Correa, former president of Ecuador
 Nicola Coughlan, Irish actress
 Angela Davis, political activist and academic
 Fabio De Masi, German politician and economist
 Rob Delaney, comedian
 Robert Del Naja, musician and graffiti artist
 Panicos Demetriades, economist
 Danny DeVito, American actor, director, producer, and filmmaker
 Leena Dhingra, television actress
 Danny Dorling, social geographer
 Joe Dunthorne, novelist and poet
 Tom Dyckhoff, journalist and television presenter
 Will Eaves, author
 Michael Eavis, dairy farmer and founder of the Glastonbury festival
 David Edgar, playwright
 Travis Elborough, writer
 Brian Eno, musician
 Íñigo Errejón, Spanish politician
 Ali Esbati, Swedish politician and columnist
 Miatta Fahnbulleh, chief executive of the New Economics Foundation
 Adham Faramawy, artist
 Andrew Feinstein, former South African politician
 Mark Fell, music producer and artist
 Shiva Feshareki, experimental composer
 Jem Finer, musician
 Liza Fior, architect
 Liam Fray, musician
 Stephen Frears, film director
 Selma James, feminist
 Jumpin Jack Frost, DJ and record producer
 Guy Garvey, singer, songwriter and radio presenter
 Tefere Gebre, union leader
 Geeneus, DJ
 Ghetts, grime MC
 Tariq Goddard, novelist and publisher
 John Goodby, chemist
 Antony Gormley, sculptor
 Nikhil Goyal, writer
 David Graeber, anthropologist and anarchist
 John Grahl, economist
 Matthew Green, Canadian politician
 Professor Green, rapper and singer-songwriter
 Stephany Griffith-Jones, economist
 Patrick Harrington, political activist
 Sofie Hagen, comedian
 Peter Hallward, philosopher
 Barbara Harriss-White, economist
 David Harrison, artist
 M. John Harrison, author and critic
 Douglas Hart, musician
 Owen Hatherley, journalist and writer
 Chris Hayes, American journalist
 Charles Hayward, musician
 Libby Heaney, artist, physicist and lecturer
 Edwin Heathcote, architect
 Tony Heaton, artist
 Peter Herbert, barrister
 Kevin Higgins, Irish poet
 Susan Himmelweit, economist
 Peter Hobbs, novelist
 Richard Hollis, graphic designer
 Peter Hooton, singer
 Srećko Horvat, philosopher
 House House, video game developer
 Michael Hrebeniak, academic, author, jazz musician and journalist
 Joseph Huber, economist
 Will Hutton, economist (endorsed Liberal Democrats in some constituencies)
 Timothy Hyman, artist
 Pablo Iglesias Turrión, Spanish politician
 Eddie Izzard, comedian and actor
 Lars Iyer, novelist and philosopher
 Michael Jacobs, economist
 Juliet Jacques, journalist
 Jamelia, recording artist and television presenter
 Gus John, writer
 Linton Kwesi Johnson, dub poet
 Fred Johnston, Irish writer
 Richard Jolly, economist
 Owen Jones, journalist, author and political activist
 Meena Kandasamy, Indian poet
 Kano, rapper
 Asif Kapadia, film director
 Anish Kapoor, contemporary artist
 Ronnie Kasrils, South African politician
 Aki Kaurismäki, Finnish film director
 Roz Kaveney, writer, critic and poet
 John Keane, artist
 Shaun Keaveny, broadcaster
 Steve Keen, economist
 Patrick Keiller, film director
 Peter Kennard, photomontage artist
 A. L. Kennedy, author and comedian
 Laleh Khalili, academic
 Sharon Kivland, American-British artist
 Naomi Klein, author, social activist, and filmmaker
 Hanif Kureishi, playwright, screenwriter and novelist
 Francesco Laforgia, Italian politician
 Kate Lamb, actor
 Mark Leckey, artist
 Lawrence Lek, multimedia artist
 Mike Leigh, film and theatre writer
 Dua Lipa, singer
 Frank Ocean, singer-songwriter
 Little Mix, girl group
 Guillaume Long, Ecuadorian politician and academic
 Josie Long, comedian
 Hannah Lowe, writer
 Lowkey, rapper
 Audun Lysbakken, Norwegian politician
 M.I.A., rapper, singer-songwriter and activist
 Sophie Mackintosh, author
 Sabrina Mahfouz, poet, playwright, performer and writer
 Firoze Manji, author, activist and editor-in-chief
 Michael Mansfield, barrister
 Miriam Margolyes, actress
 Grantley Evan Marshall (aka Daddy G), musician and founding member of Massive Attack
 Francesca Martinez, actor and comedian
 Massive Attack, trip hop band
Marisa Matias, Portuguese sociologist
 Mariana Mazzucato, economist
 Jon McClure (aka The Reverend), musician
 Jon McGregor, writer
 Bill McKibben, American environmentalist and writer
 Susana Medina, writer
 Luka Mesec, Slovenian politician
 Micachu, singer, songwriter and composer
 James Miller, novelist and academic
 Anna Minton, journalist and writer
 Maurice Mitchell, American activist and musician
 George Monbiot, writer and political activist (also endorsed the Green Party)
 Juan Carlos Monedero, Spanish politician
 Alan Moore, writer
 Mick Moore, political economist
 Thurston Moore, musician and member of Sonic Youth
 Alan Morrison, poet
 Graham Mort, poet
 Bjørnar Moxnes, Norwegian politician
 John Muckle, writer
 Neel Mukherjee, writer
 Hugh Mulholland, curator
 Richard Murphy, political economist
 Karma Nabulsi, academic
 Sara Nelson, flight attendant and union leader
 Andy Nicholson (formerly of Arctic Monkeys), musician, DJ, record producer and photographer
 Alex Niven, writer
 Peter Oborne, journalist
 Leo Panitch, Canadian writer
 Ian Parks, writer
 Maxine Peake, actor
 Avinash Persaud, economist
 Alex Pheby, author and academic
 Heather Phillipson, artist
 Tom Pickard, poet and filmmaker
 Kate Pickett, epidemiologist
 Thomas Piketty, economist
 Joanna Piotrowska, Polish photographer
 David Pollard, writer
 Jocelyn Pook, composer, pianist, viola player
 Chris Power, short story writer and literary critic
 John Power, singer, songwriter and rhythm guitarist
 Agata Pyzik, journalist and cultural critic
 Carlos Ramirez-Rosa, American council member
 Kate Raworth, economist
 Bernd Riexinger, German politician and trade union organiser
 Keith Ridgway, novelist
 Robin Rimbaud, electronic musician
 Charlotte Ritchie, actor
 Rossana Rodriguez-Sanchez, American politician
 Dani Rodrik, economist
 Sally Rooney, author
 Nadia Rose, rapper
 Michael Rosen, children's author
 Leone Ross, writer
 Lee Rourke, writer
 Anne Rouse, American-British poet
 Dilma Rousseff, former President of Brazil
 Dave Rowntree, musician
 Martin Rowson, cartoonist
 Mark Ruffalo, actor
 Mark Rylance, actor and playwright
 Emmanuel Saez, economist
 Logan Sama, grime DJ
 Emeli Sandé, singer-songwriter
 Ash Sarkar, journalist and political activist
 John Sauven, CEO of Greenpeace
 Alexei Sayle, comedian
 Vivien Schmidt, political economist
 Erica Scourti, artist
 Lynne Segal, academic and activist
 Nadine Shah, singer and songwriter
 Tai Shani, artist
 Jesse Sharkey, trade unionist and teacher
 Prem Sikka, accountant
 Shura, singer, songwriter and record producer
 Robert Skidelsky, economic historian
 Sleaford Mods, electronic punk music duo
 Catherine Slessor, architecture critic
 Charlie Sloth, DJ, producer and television presenter
 Gillian Slovo, South African writer
 Robyn Slovo, film producer
 John Smith, filmmaker
 Ahdaf Soueif, Egyptian novelist
 Neville Southall, footballer
 Christiana Spens, writer, academic and artist
 Amia Srinivasan, academic philosopher
 Larry Stabbins, musician
 Guy Standing, economist
 Bob Stanley, musician
 Frances Stewart, economist
 Stormzy, rapper and singer-songwriter
 Jonas Sjöstedt, Swedish politician
 David Stubbs, journalist
 Bhaskar Sunkara, American writer and founder of Jacobin
 Joelle Taylor, poet, playwright and author
 Kae Tempest, spoken-word performer
 Jade Thirlwall, singer in girlgroup Little Mix
 Jess Thom, artist and comedian
 Mark Thomas, comedian and activist
 Nicola Thorp, actor
 Jeremy Till, architect, educator and writer
 Angela Topping, poet
 Daniel Trilling, journalist, editor and author
 Miguel Urbán, Spanish politician
 Steven Van Zandt, American musician and activist
 Yanis Varoufakis, economist
 Idoia Villanueva, Spanish politician
 Nikolaj Villumsen, Danish politician
 Marina Vishmidt, American writer, editor and critic
 Oliver Wainwright, architecture and design critic
 Stewart Wallis, economist
 Joanna Walsh, author and critic
 Ashley Walters, rapper, musician and actor
 Jo Walton, Welsh-Canadian writer
 Martyn Ware, musician and composer
 Roger Waters, musician and member of Pink Floyd
 John Weeks, economist
 Vivienne Westwood, fashion designer and businesswoman
 Wiley, musician
 Richard G. Wilkinson, epidemiologist
 Eley Williams, author
 Wolf Alice, band
 Jason Wood, writer
 Simon Wren-Lewis, economist
 Gary Younge, journalist, author and broadcaster
 Benjamin Zephaniah, poet and author
 Mandla Mandela, anti-apartheid activist, grandson of Nelson Mandela
 Gabriel Zucman, economist

 Liberal Democrats 

 Mohammed Amin, businessman and former chairman of the Conservative Muslim Forum
 Frances Barber, actor
 Nick Boles, former Conservative and independent MP
 Alex Chesterman, entrepreneur and founder of Lovefilm, Zoopla and Cazoo
 Richard Dawkins, ethologist, evolutionary biologist, and author (also endorsed the SNP, Plaid Cymru, and Greens)
 Julian Dunkerton, businessman and co-founder of clothing retailer Superdry
 Greg Dyke, former Director-General of the BBC
 David Gauke, former Conservative and Independent MP
 Tanya Gold, journalist
 Michael Heseltine, former Conservative MP and deputy prime minister (endorsed independents in some constituencies)
 David Hirsh, sociologist and activist (endorsed Change UK in some constituencies)
 Dom Joly, comedian and columnist
 Emma Kennedy, actress, writer and presenter (not in all constituencies)
 Ewan Kirk, entrepreneur and founder and CIO of Cantab Capital Partners
 Eddie Marsan, actor
 Chris Martin, lead singer of Coldplay
 Deborah Meaden, businesswoman and Dragons' Den dragon
 Alan C. Parker businessman, chairman of Mothercare, and former CEO of Whitbread
 Matthew Parris, former Conservative MP and journalist
 Michael Rake, businessman and former President of the CBI
 Rachel Riley, television presenter and mathematician
 Tim Sainsbury, former Conservative MP and businessman
 Dan Snow, historian and television presenter
 John Tusa, arts administrator and journalist
 Vivian Wineman, former president of the Board of Deputies of British Jews

 Plaid Cymru 
 Richard Dawkins, ethologist, evolutionary biologist, and author (also endorsed the Liberal Democrats, SNP, and Greens)

 Scottish National Party 

 Richard Dawkins, ethologist, evolutionary biologist, and author (also endorsed the Liberal Democrats, Plaid Cymru, and Greens)
 Bendor Grosvenor, art historian, writer and former art dealer
 Suzanne Moore, journalist

 Organisations 

 Conservative Party 
 Bruges Group
 Leave.EU (also endorsed the DUP, UUP, Brexit Party and Independent candidates in some constituencies)
 Overseas Friends of the Bharatiya Janata Party (not in all seats)
 Young Christian Democrats (Sweden)

 Democratic Unionist Party 
 Leave.EU

 Labour Party 
Trades unions

 Associated Society of Locomotive Engineers and Firemen
 Bakers, Food and Allied Workers' Union
 Communication Workers Union
 Fire Brigades Union
 GMB
 Public and Commercial Services Union
 Transport Salaried Staffs' Association
 Union of Shop, Distributive and Allied Workers
 Unite the Union

Other

 Alliance for Workers' Liberty
 Boiler Room
 Democracy in Europe Movement 2025
 Democratic Socialists of America
 Jammu Kashmir Liberation Front
 Jewish Socialists' Group
 Lewica Razem
 Muslim Public Affairs Committee UK
 Pluto Press
 Socialist Resistance
 Young Communist League
 The People for Bernie Sanders

 Parties 
Parties not contesting these elections
Some parties are not contesting these elections and have endorsed other parties.

For Labour:
 Communist Party of Britain
 Left Unity
 New Communist Party of Britain
 Socialist Party
 Socialist Party (Ireland)
 Socialist Party Scotland
 Socialist Workers Party
 Workers Revolutionary Party

Parties only contesting some constituencies
Some parties which only contest elections in certain parts of the United Kingdom endorsed political parties in areas they do not contest.
 The Liberal Democrats endorsed the Alliance Party in Northern Ireland.
 The National Health Action Party (NHA) endorsed voting against the Conservatives.
 The UK Independence Party (UKIP) endorsed the Conservative Party in constituencies which they were not contesting.

 Endorsements in individual constituencies 

A
 Aberavon 

For Stephen Kinnock (Labour):
 More United

 Aberconwy 

For Emily Owen (Labour):
 Compass
 People's Vote

 Aberdeen South 

For Stephen Flynn (SNP):
 Our Future Our Choice

 Altrincham and Sale West 

For Andrew Western (Labour):
 Sacha Lord, entrepreneur

 Alyn and Deeside 

For Mark Tami (Labour):
 People's Vote

 Angus 

For Dave Doogan (SNP):
 Our Future Our Choice

 Arfon 

For Hywel Williams (PC):
 Green Party of England and Wales
 Liberal Democrats
 More United
 Renew Party

 Argyll and Bute 

For Brendan O'Hara (SNP):
 Robert Florence, presenter and comedian

 Arundel and South Downs 

For Bella Sankey (Labour):
 James Nesbitt, actor

 Ashfield 

For Natalie Fleet (Labour):
 More United
 People's Vote

B
 Banbury 

For Suzette Watson (Labour):
 Alastair Campbell, journalist, broadcaster, author and former Labour political aide

 Banff and Buchan 

For Paul Robertson (SNP):
 Our Future Our Choice

 Barrow and Furness 

For Chris Altree (Labour):
 Compass
 For our Future's Sake
 People's Vote

For Simon Fell (Conservative):
 John Woodcock, former Labour and Independent MP for Barrow and Furness

 Barnsley Central 

For Victoria Felton (Brexit Party):
 Leave.EU

 Bassetlaw 

For Keir Morrison (Labour):
 People's Vote

 Bath 

For Wera Hobhouse (Lib Dem):
 Green Party of England and Wales
 More United
 Renew Party

 Battersea 

For Marsha de Cordova (Labour):
 Compass
 More United (also endorsed Mark Gitsham in the same constituency)
 Our Future Our Choice
 People's Vote
 Paapa Essiedu, actor

For Mark Gitsham (Lib Dem):
 More United (also endorsed Marsha de Cordova in the same constituency)

 Beaconsfield 

For Dominic Grieve (independent):
 Liberal Democrats
 People's Vote
 Steve Brookstein, singer
 John Finnemore, actor and comedy writer
 David Gauke, former Conservative MP
 Hugh Grant, actor and film producer
 David Allen Green, lawyer and legal journalist
 Michael Heseltine, former Conservative MP and deputy prime minister
 John Major, former Conservative prime minister
 Chris Patten, former Conservative MP and Chairman of the Conservative Party
 Jenni Russell, journalist and broadcaster
 Ian Taylor, former Conservative MP
 Jon Worth, political commentator, campaigner and lecturer

 Bedford 

For Mohammed Yasin (Labour):
 Compass
 People's Vote

For Henry Vann (Lib Dem)
 Independent hospital campaigner and founder of the 'Save Bedford Hospital Party', Dr. Barry Monk

 Belfast East 

For Naomi Long (Alliance):
 People's Vote
 Sinn Féin
 Social Democratic and Labour Party
 Green Party in Northern Ireland

For Gavin Robinson (DUP):
 Jamie Bryson, political activist

 Belfast North 

For Nigel Dodds (DUP):
 Ulster Unionist Party
 Traditional Unionist Voice
 Jamie Bryson, political activist

For John Finucane (Sinn Féin):
 Social Democratic and Labour Party
 Green Party in Northern Ireland

 Belfast South 

For Claire Hanna (SDLP):
 People's Vote
 Sinn Féin
 Green Party in Northern Ireland
 Our Future Our Choice

For Emma Little-Pengelly (DUP):
 Jamie Bryson, political activist

 Bermondsey and Old Southwark 

For Neil Coyle (Labour):
 Jo Maugham, barrister

For Humaira Ali (Lib Dem):
 Green Party of England and Wales
 More United
 Renew Party

 Birkenhead 

For Frank Field (Birkenhead Social Justice Party):
 Leave.EU

 Birmingham Edgbaston 

For Preet Gill (Labour):
 More United
 Our Future Our Choice

 Birmingham Erdington 

For Jack Dromey (Labour):
 More United

 Birmingham Northfield 

For Richard Burden (Labour):
 Compass
 More United

 Birmingham Yardley 
For Jess Phillips (Labour):
 More United
 Emily Benn, research assistant and former Labour politician
 Ingrid Oliver, actor and comedian

 Bishop Auckland 

For Helen Goodman (Labour):
 Compass
 More United
 Our Future Our Choice
 People's Vote

For Dehenna Davison (Conservative):
 Leave.EU
 Kate Hoey, former Labour MP and co-founder of Grassroots Out

 Blackley and Broughton 

For Graham Stringer (Labour):
 Kate Hoey, former Labour MP and co-founder of Grassroots Out

 Bolsover 

For Dennis Skinner (Labour):
 People's Vote

 Bolton North East 

For David Crausby (Labour):
 Compass
 People's Vote

 Bolton West 

For Julie Hilling (Labour):
 Compass

 Bournemouth West 

For Conor Burns (Conservative):
 Kate Hoey, former Labour MP and co-founder of Grassroots Out

 Braintree 

For Jo Beavis (Independent):
 Green Party of England and Wales

 Brecon and Radnorshire 

For Jane Dodds (Lib Dem):
 Compass
 Green Party of England and Wales
 More United
 People's Vote
 Plaid Cymru
 Renew Party

 Brentford and Isleworth 

For Ruth Cadbury (Labour):
 More United

 Bridgend 

For Madeleine Moon (Labour):
 People's Vote

 Brighton Kemptown 

For Lloyd Russell-Moyle (Labour);
 Guy Pratt, musician, comedian and actor
 Simon Price, music critic

 Brighton Pavilion 

For Caroline Lucas (Green):
 Compass
 Liberal Democrats
 More United
 Renew Party
 Heather Peace, singer-songwriter and actress
 Catherine Russell, actress

 Bristol North West 

For Darren Jones (Labour):
 More United
 Our Future Our Choice
 People's Vote
 Emily Benn, research assistant and former Labour politician
 Ross Kemp, actor, author and journalist

 Bristol West 

For Carla Denyer (Green):
 Margaret Cabourn-Smith, comedy actress
 Liberal Democrats
 Renew Party

 Broxbourne 

For Julia Bird (Lib Dem)
 Andrew Sentance, economist

 Broxtowe 

For Anna Soubry (Change UK):
 Liberal Democrats
 Ken Clarke, former Conservative MP and Chancellor of the Exchequer
 David Hirsh, sociologist
 Martyn Poliakoff, chemist
 Jenni Russell, journalist and broadcaster

 Buckingham 

For Stephen Dorrell (Lib Dem):
 Green Party of England and Wales
 Renew Party

 Burnley 

For Julie Cooper (Labour):
 People's Vote

 Bury North 

For James Frith (Labour):
 People's Vote

 Bury South 

For Lucy Burke (Labour):
 People's Vote

For Christian Wakeford (Conservative):
 Ivan Lewis, independent candidate, and former Labour and independent MP for the seat

 Bury St Edmunds 

For Helen Geake (Green):
 Liberal Democrats
 Renew Party

C
 Caerphilly 

For Lindsay Whittle (PC):
 Green Party of England and Wales
 Liberal Democrats
 Renew Party

 Caithness, Sutherland and Easter Ross 

For Jamie Stone (Lib Dem):
 More United

For Karl Rosie (SNP):
 Edwyn Collins, musician

 Calder Valley 

For Josh Fenton-Glynn (Labour):
 Compass
 Green Party of England and Wales

 Camborne and Redruth 

For Paul Farmer (Labour):
 People's Vote

 Cambridge 

For Rod Cantrill (Lib Dem):
 More United

For Daniel Zeichner (Labour):
 Mary Beard, classicist
 People's Vote

 Cannock Chase 

For Paul Woodhead (Green):
 Liberal Democrats
 Renew Party

 Canterbury 
For Rosie Duffield (Labour):
 Compass
 For our Future's Sake
 More United
 People's Vote
 Women's Equality Party
 Ayesha Hazarika, broadcaster, journalist and former adviser to the Labour Party
 Dave Prentis, trade unionist
 Angela Saini, science journalist, broadcaster and author
 Sandi Toksvig, writer, broadcaster and co-founder of the Women's Equality Party

 Cardiff Central 

For Bablin Molik (Lib Dem):
 Green Party of England and Wales
 Plaid Cymru
 Renew Party

 Cardiff North 

For Anna McMorrin (Labour):
 People's Vote

 Cardiff South and Penarth 

For Stephen Doughty (Labour Co-op):
 More United

 Carmarthen East and Dinefwr 

For Jonathan Edwards (PC):
 Compass
 Green Party of England and Wales
 Liberal Democrats
 Renew Party

 Carshalton and Wallington 

For Tom Brake (Lib Dem):
 Compass
 More United
 People's Vote

 Central Ayrshire 

For Philippa Whitford (SNP):
 More United
 Eddi Reader, singer-songwriter

 Ceredigion 

For Ben Lake (PC):
 More United (also endorsed Mark Williams in the same constituency)

For Mark Williams (Lib Dem):
 More United (also endorsed Ben Lake in the same constituency)

 Cheadle 

For Tom Morrison (Lib Dem):
 Compass
 Green Party of England and Wales
 More United
 Our Future Our Choice
 People's Vote
 Renew Party

 Chelmsford 

For Marie Goldman (Lib Dem):
 Green Party of England and Wales
 People's Vote
 Renew Party

 Chelsea and Fulham 

For Nicola Horlick (Lib Dem):
 Green Party of England and Wales
 People's Vote
 Renew Party
 Hugh Grant, actor and film producer

 Cheltenham 

For Max Wilkinson (Lib Dem):
 Compass
 For our Future's Sake
 Green Party of England and Wales
 More United
 People's Vote
 Renew Party

 Chingford and Woodford Green 

For Faiza Shaheen (Labour):
 Compass
 Green Party of England and Wales
 Alastair Campbell, journalist, broadcaster, author and former Labour political aide
 Hugh Grant, actor and film producer
 Ayesha Hazarika, broadcaster, journalist and former adviser to the Labour Party
 Ewan Pearson, electronic music producer
 David Schneider, actor

 Chippenham 

For Helen Belcher (Lib Dem):
 Green Party of England and Wales
 Renew Party

 Chipping Barnet 

For Emma Whysall (Labour):
 Compass
 For our Future's Sake
 More United
 Our Future Our Choice
 People's Vote
 Alastair Campbell, journalist, broadcaster, author and former Labour political aide
 Fiona Millar, journalist and campaigner
 Paul Morrison, film director

For Theresa Villiers (Conservative):
 Ivan Lewis, former independent and Labour MP

 Cities of London and Westminster 

For Chuka Umunna (Lib Dem):
 More United
 People's Vote
 Renew Party
 Patience Wheatcroft, journalist and Conservative life peer
 Women's Equality Party
 Hugh Grant, actor and film producer

 Clwyd South 

For Susan Elan Jones (Labour):
 Compass
 More United
 People's Vote

 Colchester 

For Martin Goss (Lib Dem):
 Compass
 People's Vote

 Colne Valley 

For Thelma Walker (Labour):
 Compass
 People's Vote

 Corby 

For Beth Miller (Labour):
 More United

Crawley

For Peter Lamb (Labour):
 More United
 People's Vote
 Hugh Grant, actor and film producer

 Crewe and Nantwich 

For Laura Smith (Labour):
 Compass
 People's Vote

 Croydon Central 

For Sarah Jones (Labour):
 People's Vote

 Cumbernauld and Kilsyth 

For Stuart McDonald (SNP):
 More United

D
 Dagenham and Rainham 

For Jon Cruddas (Labour):
 Compass

 Darlington 

For Jenny Chapman (Labour):
 People's Vote
 Alastair Campbell, journalist, broadcaster, author and former Labour political aide

 Delyn 

For David Hanson (Labour):
 People's Vote

 Derby North 

For Tony Tinley (Labour):
 Compass
 People's Vote

 Dewsbury 

For Paula Sherriff (Labour):
 People's Vote

 Doncaster North 

For Ed Miliband (Labour):
 More United

 Dover 

For Charlotte Cornell (Labour):
 More United

 Dudley North 

For Melanie Dudley (Labour):
 Compass
 People's Vote

 Dwyfor Meirionnyth 

For Liz Saville Roberts (PC):
 Compass
 Green Party of England and Wales
 Liberal Democrats
 More United
 People's Vote
 Renew Party

 Dulwich and West Norwood 

For Jonathan Bartley (Green):
 Liberal Democrats

E
 Ealing Central and Acton 

For Rupa Huq (Labour):
 More United
 United Voices of the World
 Charlie Brooker, journalist, broadcaster and wrirter

 Ealing Southall 

For Virendra Sharma (Labour):
 Overseas Friends of the Bharatiya Janata Party

 East Devon 

For Claire Wright (Independent):
 Compass
 Unite to Remain
 Martin Bell, former independent MP
 Julie Girling, former independent and Conservative MEP
 Hugh Grant, actor and film producer

 East Kilbride, Strathaven and Lesmahagow 

For Lisa Cameron (SNP):
 More United

 East Lothian 

For Kenny MacAskill (SNP):
 Jackie McNamara Sr., footballer

For Martin Whitfield (Labour):
 More United

 East Renfrewshire 

For Paul Masterton (Conservative):
 More United

 East Surrey 

For Frances Rehal (Labour):
 Emmy the Great, singer-songwriter

 Eastbourne 

For Stephen Lloyd (Lib Dem):
 Compass
 More United
 Our Future Our Choice
 People's Vote

 Eastleigh 

For Lynda Murphy (Lib Dem):
 People's Vote

 Eddisbury 

For Antoinette Sandbach (Lib Dem):
 More United

 Edinburgh South 

For Ian Murray (Labour):
 More United

 Edinburgh West 

For Christine Jardine (Lib Dem):
 More United

 Enfield Southgate 

For Bambos Charalambous (Labour):
 People's Vote

 Esher and Walton 

For Monica Harding (Lib Dem):
 Compass
 Green Party of England and Wales
 More United
 Our Future Our Choice
 People's Vote
 Renew Party
 Mitch Benn, comedian, author and musician
 Alastair Campbell, journalist, broadcaster, author and former Labour political aide
 Tim Dunn and Charlotte Charles, parents of Harry Dunn
 Hugh Grant, actor and film producer
 David Allen Green, lawyer and legal journalist
 Ayesha Hazarika, broadcaster, journalist and former adviser to the Labour Party
 Will Hutton, political economist
 James Purefoy, actor
 David Schneider, actor
 Ian Taylor, former Conservative MP for the constituency
 Femi Oluwole, campaigner

 Exeter 

For Ben Bradshaw (Labour):
 More United
 Deborah Meaden, businesswoman

For Joe Levy (Green):
 Liberal Democrats
 Renew Party

F
 Falkirk 

For John McNally (SNP):
 Eric Joyce, former independent and Labour MP for the constituency

 Feltham and Heston 

For Seema Malhotra (Labour Co-op):
 More United

 Fermanagh and South Tyrone 

For Tom Elliott (UUP):
 Democratic Unionist Party
 Traditional Unionist Voice
 Leave.EU
 Kate Hoey, former Labour MP and co-founder of Grassroots Out

For Caroline Wheeler (Independent):
 Socialist Party (Ireland)

 Filton and Bradley Stoke 

For Mhairi Threlfall (Labour):
 Compass

 Finchley and Golders Green 

For Luciana Berger (Lib Dem):
 Green Party of England and Wales
 More United
 Our Future Our Choice
 People's Vote
 Renew Party
 Emily Benn, research assistant and former Labour politician
 Alastair Campbell, journalist, broadcaster, author and former Labour political aide
 Hugh Grant, actor and film producer
 Laura Janner-Klausner, Senior Rabbi to Reform Judaism
 Deborah Lipstadt, American historian
 Eddie Marsan, actor
 Fiona Millar, journalist and campaigner
 Paul Morrison, film director
 Simon Schama, historian

For Ross Houston (Labour):
 Danny Rich, rabbi and chief executive of Liberal Judaism

 Forest of Dean 

For Chris McFarling (Green):
 Liberal Democrats
 Renew Party

G
 Gedling 

For Vernon Coaker (Labour):
 People's Vote

 Glasgow Central 

For Alison Thewliss (SNP):
 More United

 Glasgow East 

For Kate Watson (Labour):
 More United

 Glasgow North 

For Patrick Grady (SNP):
 More United

 Glasgow North East 

For Paul Sweeney (Labour):
 Robert Florence, presenter and comedian

 Glasgow South 

For Johann Lamont (Labour):
 Stuart Campbell, video game journalist

For Stewart McDonald (SNP):
 More United

 Glasgow South West 

For Chris Stephens (SNP):
 More United
 Cat Boyd, political activist

 Gloucester 

For Fran Boait (Labour):
 Compass

 Gordon 

For Richard Thomson (SNP):
 Our Future Our Choice

 Gower 

For Tonia Antoniazzi (Labour):
 More United
 People's Vote
 Russell T Davies, screenwriter and television producer

 Guildford 

For Zöe Franklin (Lib Dem):
 Green Party of England and Wales
 Our Future Our Choice
 People's Vote
 Renew Party
 Ayesha Hazarika, broadcaster, journalist and former adviser to the Labour Party
 David Schneider, actor, writer and comedian

For Anne Milton (independent):
 More United
 David Gauke, former Conservative MP
 Michael Heseltine, former Conservative MP and deputy prime minister
 John Major, former Conservative prime minister
 Chris Patten, former Conservative MP and Chairman of the Conservative Party
 Jenni Russell, journalist and broadcaster
 Ian Taylor, former Conservative MP

H
 Hammersmith 

For Andy Slaughter (Labour) :
 More United
 Noga Levy-Rapoport, climate activist, public speaker, and organiser of the UK climate strikes

 Hampstead and Kilburn 

For Tulip Siddiq (Labour):
 More United

 Harrogate and Knaresborough 

For Judith Rogerson (Lib Dem):
 Green Party of England and Wales
 More United
 Renew Party
 Reece Dinsdale, actor and director

 Harrow East 

For Pamela Fitzpatrick (Labour):
 Compass

 Harrow West 

For Gareth Thomas (Labour Co-op):
 More United

 Hartlepool 

For Richard Tice (Brexit Party):
 Leave.EU
 Kate Hoey, former Labour MP and co-founder of Grassroots Out
 Tim Martin, businessman and chairman of Wetherspoons

 Hastings and Rye 

For Peter Chowney (Labour):
 Compass
 People's Vote

For Sally-Ann Hart (Conservative):
 Leave.EU

 Hazel Grove 

For Lisa Smart (Lib Dem):
 Green Party of England and Wales
 More United
 People's Vote
 Renew Party

 Hendon 

For David Pinto-Duschinsky (Labour):
 For our Future's Sake
 People's Vote

 High Peak 

For Ruth George (Labour):
 Compass
 People's Vote

 Hitchin and Harpenden 

For Sam Collins (Lib Dem):
 Green Party of England and Wales
 People's Vote
 Renew Party

 Holborn and St Pancras 

For Keir Starmer (Labour):
 Ayesha Hazarika, broadcaster, journalist and former adviser to the Labour Party
 Deborah Meaden, businesswoman

 Hornsey and Wood Green 

For Catherine West (Labour):
 More United

 Houghton and Sunderland South 

For Bridget Phillipson (Labour):
 Alastair Campbell, journalist, broadcaster, author and former Labour political aide

 Hove 

For Peter Kyle (Labour):
 More United

I
 Ilford North 

For Wes Streeting (Labour):
 More United
 Ayesha Hazarika, broadcaster, journalist and former adviser to the Labour Party

 Ilford South 

For Mike Gapes (Change UK):
 David Hirsh, sociologist

 Inverclyde 

For Martin McCluskey (Labour):
 More United

For Ronnie Cowan (SNP):
 Martin Compston, actor

 Ipswich 

For Sandy Martin (Labour):
 Compass
 People's Vote

 Isle of Wight 

For Vix Lowthion (Green):
 Compass
 Liberal Democrats
 Renew Party

K
 Keighley 

For John Grogan (Labour):
 Compass
 More United
 People's Vote
 Alastair Campbell, journalist, broadcaster, author and former Labour political aide

 Kensington 

For Emma Dent Coad (Labour):
 Beatie Edney, actress
 Peter Jukes, writer
 Noga Levy-Rapoport, climate activist, public speaker, and organiser of the UK climate strikes

For Sam Gyimah (Lib Dem):
 More United
 People's Vote
 Hugo Dixon, business journalist
 Tom Hollander, actor
 Jenni Russell, journalist and broadcaster

 Kingston upon Hull East 

For Karl Turner (Labour):
 Ricky Tomlinson, actor

 Kirkcaldy and Cowdenbeath 

For Neale Hanvey (withdrawn by SNP):
 Stuart Campbell, video game journalist

L
 Lanark and Hamilton East 

For Andrew Hilland (Labour):
 More United

 Lancaster and Fleetwood 

For Cat Smith (Labour):
 Harold Elletson, former Conservative MP, former Northern Party candidate in the constituency in 2015
 People's Vote

 Leeds Central 

For Hilary Benn (Labour):
 Emily Benn, research assistant, former Labour politician

 Leeds North West 

For Kamran Hussain (Lib Dem):
 More United (also endorsed Alex Sobel in the same constituency)

For Alex Sobel (Labour Co-op):
 Jewish Labour Movement
 More United (also endorsed Kamran Hussain in the same constituency)

 Leicester West 

For Liz Kendall (Labour):
 More United

 Lewes 

For Oli Henman (Lib Dem):
 Compass
 Our Future Our Choice
 More United
 People's Vote
 Steve Coogan, actor and comedian
 Will Hutton, political economist

 Lincoln 

For Karen Lee (Labour):
 Compass
 People's Vote

 Linlithgow and East Falkirk 

For Martyn Day (SNP):
 More United

 Llanelli 

For Mari Arthur (PC):
 Green Party of England and Wales
 Liberal Democrats
 Renew Party

 Luton South 

For Gavin Shuker (independent):
 Liberal Democrats
 More United

M
 Macclesfield 

For Neil Puttick (Labour):
 More United

 Milton Keynes South 

For Hannah O'Neil (Labour):
 Our Future Our Choice
 People's Vote

 Milton Keynes North 

For Charlynne Pullen (Labour):
 Compass
 People's Vote

 Montgomeryshire 

For Kishan Devani (Lib Dem):
 Green Party of England and Wales
 More United
 Plaid Cymru

 Moray 

For Laura Mitchell (SNP):
 Our Future Our Choice

 Morley and Outwood 

For Deanne Ferguson (Labour):
 Tim Roache, trade unionist

For Andrea Jenkyns (Conservative):
 Leave.EU

N
 Newcastle-under-Lyme 

For Carl Greatbatch (Labour):
 Compass
 People's Vote

 Newcastle upon Tyne North 

For Catherine McKinnell (Labour):
 More United

 Newport West 

For Ruth Jones (Labour):
 People's Vote

 Newton Abbot 

For Martin Wrigley (Lib Dem):
 People's Vote

 Normanton, Pontefract and Castleford 

For Andrew Lee (Conservative):
 Robert Rowland, Brexit Party MEP

 North Ayrshire and Arran 

For Patricia Gibson (SNP):
 More United

 North Cornwall 

For Danny Chambers (Lib Dem):
 Green Party of England and Wales
 People's Vote
 Renew Party

 North Devon 

For Alex White (Lib Dem):
 More United
 People's Vote

 North Down 

For Alex Easton (DUP):
 Jamie Bryson, political activist

For Stephen Farry (Alliance):
 People's Vote

 North East Derbyshire 
For Lee Rowley (Conservative)
 Steve Perez, entrepreneur and rally driver

 North East Fife 

For Wendy Chamberlain (Lib Dem):
 More United (also endorsed Stephen Gethins in the same constituency)

For Stephen Gethins (SNP):
 More United (also endorsed Wendy Chamberlain in the same constituency)
 Steve Murdoch, academic

 North East Somerset 

For Mark Huband (Labour):
 Jim Rossignol, computer games journalist and critic
 Siobhan Thompson, comedian

 North Norfolk 

For Karen Ward (Lib Dem):
 Compass
 Green Party of England and Wales
 More United
 People's Vote
 Renew Party

 Norwich North 

For Karen Davis (Labour):
 Compass

 Norwich South 

For Clive Lewis (Labour):
 Dave Rowntree, drummer in Blur

 Nottingham South 

For Lilian Greenwood (Labour):
 More United

O
 Ochil and South Perthshire 

For John Nicolson (SNP):
 Our Future Our Choice

 Ogmore 

For Chris Elmore (Labour):
 More United

 Orkney and Shetland 

For Alistair Carmichael (Lib Dem):
 More United

 Oxford West and Abingdon 

For Layla Moran (Lib Dem):
 Compass
 Green Party of England and Wales
 More United
 People's Vote
 Renew Party
 Trisha Greenhalgh, professor of primary health care
 Chris Lintott, astrophysicist
 Philip Pullman, author

P
 Paisley and Renfrewshire North 

For Gavin Newlands (SNP):
 More United (also endorsed Alison Taylor in the same constituency)

For Alison Taylor (Labour):
 More United (also endorsed Gavin Newlands in the same constituency)

 Pendle 

For Azhar Ali (Labour):
 People's Vote

 Penistone and Stocksbridge 

For Francyne Johnson (Labour):
 Compass
 People's Vote

For Hannah Kitching (Lib Dem):
 Green Party of England and Wales
 Renew Party

 Peterborough 

For Lisa Forbes (Labour):
 Compass
 People's Vote

 Plymouth Moor View 

For Charlotte Holloway (Labour):
 More United

 Plymouth Sutton and Devonport 

For Luke Pollard (Labour):
 People's Vote

 Pontypridd 

For Fflur Elin (PC):
 Green Party of England and Wales
 Liberal Democrats
 Renew Party

 Portsmouth South 

For Stephen Morgan (Labour):
 For our Future's Sake
 More United (also endorsed Gerald Vernon-Jackson in the same constituency)
 Our Future Our Choice
 Gordon Brown, former Labour Prime Minister and Chancellor
 Matthew Oakeshott, former Liberal Democrat peer, now a crossbench peer

For Gerald Vernon-Jackson (Lib Dem):
 Green Party of England and Wales
 More United (also endorsed Stephen Morgan in the same constituency)
 Renew Party

 Pudsey 

For Jane Aitchison (Labour):
 Compass
 People's Vote

 Putney 

For Fleur Anderson (Labour):
 More United (also endorsed Sue Wixley in the same constituency)
 Our Future Our Choice
 Alastair Campbell, journalist, broadcaster, author and former Labour political aide
 Ayesha Hazarika, broadcaster, journalist and former adviser to the Labour Party
 Emma Kennedy, actress, writer and presenter

For Sue Wixley (Lib Dem):
 More United (also endorsed Fleur Anderson in the same constituency)
 Jolyon Maugham, barrister

R
 Reading East 

For Matt Rodda (Labour):
 People's Vote

 Reading West 

For Rachel Eden (Labour):
 Compass
 More United
 People's Vote
 Hugh Grant, actor and film producer

 Redcar 

For Anna Turley (Labour):
 Alastair Campbell, journalist, broadcaster, author and former Labour political aide

 Richmond Park 

For Sarah Olney (Lib Dem):
 Compass
 Green Party of England and Wales
 Renew Party
 People's Vote
 Mitch Benn, comedian, author and musician
 Bamber Gascoigne, television presenter
 Will Hutton, political economist
 Kevin Maguire, journalist

Rhondda

For Chris Bryant (Labour):
 More United

 Romsey and Southampton North 

For Craig Fletcher (Lib Dem):
 Green Party of England and Wales
 Renew Party

 Rossendale and Darwen 

For Alyson Barnes (Labour):
 More United
 Alastair Campbell, journalist, broadcaster, author and former Labour political aide

 Rother Valley 

For Sophie Wilson (Labour):
 People's Vote

 Rushcliffe 

For Jason Billin (Lib Dem):
 Green Party of England and Wales
 More United (also endorsed Cheryl Pidgeon in the same constituency)
 Renew Party

For Cheryl Pidgeon (Labour):
 More United (also endorsed Jason Billin in the same constituency)

 Rutherglen and Hamilton West 

For Gerard Killen (Labour):
 More United

S
 Scunthorpe 

For Nic Dakin (Labour):
 More United
 People's Vote

 Sedgefield 

For Phil Wilson (Labour):
 More United
 People's Vote
 Alastair Campbell, journalist, broadcaster, author and former Labour political aide

 Sheffield Central 

For Paul Blomfield (Labour):
 More United

 Sheffield Hallam 

For Laura Gordon (Lib Dem):
 More United
 People's Vote
 Women's Equality Party

 Sheffield Heeley 

For Louise Haigh (Labour):
 Ayesha Hazarika, broadcaster, journalist and former adviser to the Labour Party

 South Antrim 

For Danny Kinahan (UUP):
 People's Vote

 South Cambridgeshire 

For Ian Sollom (Lib Dem):
 Green Party of England and Wales
 Our Future Our Choice
 People's Vote
 Renew Party

 South East Cambridgshire 

For Pippa Heylings (Lib Dem):
 Green Party of England and Wales
 People's Vote
 Renew Party

 South Shields 

For Emma Lewell-Buck (Labour):
 Sheila Graber, animator and academic

 South Swindon 

For Sarah Church (Labour):
 Compass
 People's Vote

 South West Hertfordshire 

For David Gauke (independent):
 More United
 Emily Benn, research assistant and former Labour politician
 Alastair Campbell, journalist, broadcaster, author and former Labour political aide
 Kenneth Clarke, former Conservative and independent MP
 Sue Doughty, former Liberal Democrat MP
 John Finnemore, actor and comedy writer
 David Allen Green, lawyer and legal journalist
 Matthew Green, former Liberal Democrat MP
 Michael Heseltine, former Conservative MP and deputy prime minister
 John Major, former Conservative prime minister
 Gina Miller, business owner and activist
 Chris Patten, former Conservative MP and Chairman of the Conservative Party
 Amber Rudd, former Conservative and independent MP
 Jenni Russell, journalist and broadcaster
 Rory Stewart, former Conservative and independent MP
 Ian Taylor, former Conservative MP

For Gagan Mohindra (Conservative):
 Leave.EU

 South West Surrey 

For Paul Follows (Lib Dem):
 Compass
 Green Party of England and Wales
 Renew Party

 Southampton Itchen 

For Simon Letts (Labour):
 Compass
 For our Future's Sake

 Southampton Test 

For Alan Whitehead (Labour):
 More United

 Southport 

For John Wright (Lib Dem):
 Green Party of England and Wales
 More United
 People's Vote
 Renew Party

 St Albans 

For Daisy Cooper (Lib Dem):
 Compass
 For our Future's Sake
 More United
 People's Vote
 Will Hutton, political economist

 St Ives 

For Andrew George (Lib Dem):
 Compass
 More United
 Our Future Our Choice
 People's Vote
 Hugh Grant, actor and film producer

 Stevenage 

For Jill Borcherds (Labour):
 People's Vote

 Stockport 

For Wendy Meikle (Lib Dem):
 Ann Coffey, former Labour and Change UK MP

 Stockton South 

For Paul Williams (Labour):
 Compass
 More United
 People's Vote

 Stoke-on-Trent Central 

For Gareth Snell (Labour):
 People's Vote

 Stoke-on-Trent North 

For Ruth Smeeth (Labour):
 Compass
 Jewish Labour Movement
 People's Vote
 Steve Kemp, trade unionist
 Tim Roache, trade unionist

 Streatham 

For Helen Thompson (Lib Dem):
 Catherine Russell, actor

 Stroud 

For David Drew (Labour):
 Our Future Our Choice
 People's Vote
 Julie Girling, leader of the Renew Party and former Conservative and Independent MEP

For Molly Scott Cato (Green):
 Liberal Democrats
 Renew Party
 Rasmus Andresen, German Alliance 90/The Greens MEP
 Jolyon Maugham, barrister

 Sunderland Central 

For Julie Elliott (Labour):
 More United
 Alastair Campbell, journalist, broadcaster, author and former Labour political aide

 Sutton and Cheam 

For Hina Bokhari (Lib Dem):
 Compass
 More United

Swansea West

For Geraint Davies (Labour):
 More United

T
 Taunton Deane 

For Gideon Amos (Lib Dem):
 Green Party of England and Wales
 People's Vote
 Renew Party

 Telford 

For Katrina Gilman (Labour):
 Compass

 The Cotswolds 

For Alan MacKenzie (Labour):
 Paul Cornell, writer

For Liz Webster (Lib Dem):
 Julie Girling, former independent and Conservative MEP

 Thornbury and Yate 

For Claire Young (Lib Dem):
 Green Party of England and Wales
 People's Vote
 Renew Party

Tooting

For Rosena Allin-Khan (Labour):
 More United

 Totnes 

For Sarah Wollaston (Lib Dem):
 Green Party of England and Wales
 More United
 People's Vote
 Renew Party
 Alastair Campbell, journalist, broadcaster, author and former Labour political aide

Tottenham

For David Lammy (Labour):
 More United

 Truro and Falmouth 

For Jennifer Forbes (Labour):
 For our Future's Sake

For Ruth Gripper (Lib Dem):
 More United

 Tunbridge Wells 

For Ben Chapelard (Lib Dem):
 Green Party of England and Wales
 Renew Party

 Twickenham 

For Munira Wilson (Lib Dem):
 Green Party of England and Wales
 More United
 Renew Party

U
 Uxbridge and South Ruislip 

For Ali Milani (Labour):
 Lord Buckethead, novelty candidate for the constituency
 Hugo Dixon, business journalist
 Mike Galsworthy, researcher and anti-Brexit activist
 Hugh Grant, actor and film producer
 Ayesha Hazarika, broadcaster, journalist and former adviser to the Labour Party
 Zamzam Ibrahim, president of the National Union of Students
 Francis Lee, actor, film director and screenwriter
 Noga Levy-Rapoport, climate activist, public speaker, and organiser of the UK climate strikes

V
 Vale of Clwyd 

For Chris Ruane (Labour):
 Compass
 People's Vote

 Vale of Glamorgan 

For Belinda Loveluck-Edwards (Labour):
 Compass

For Anthony Slaughter (Green):
 Liberal Democrats
 Plaid Cymru
 Renew Party

 Vauxhall 

For Florence Eshalomi (Labour):
 Mat Fraser, actor and writer
 Will Straw, policy researcher and politician

W
 Wakefield 

For Mary Creagh (Labour):
 Compass
 More United
 People's Vote
 Alastair Campbell, journalist, broadcaster, author and former Labour political aide

 Walsall South 

For Gurjit Bains (Conservative):
 Amir Khan, boxer

 Wantage 

For Richard Benwell (Lib Dem):
 Green Party of England and Wales
 More United
 Renew Party

 Warrington North 

For Elizabeth Babade (Brexit Party):
 UKIP

 Warrington South 

For Ryan Bate (Lib Dem):
 Green Party of England and Wales
 Renew Party

For Faisal Rashid (Labour):
 People's Vote

For Andy Carter (Conservative):
 UKIP

 Warwick and Leamington 

For Louis Adam (Lib Dem):
 More United

For Matt Western (Labour):
 Compass
 People's Vote

 Weaver Vale 

For Mike Amesbury (Labour):
 People's Vote

 Watford 

For Chris Ostrowski (Labour):
 Compass
 For our Future's Sake
 More United (also endorsed Ian Stotesbury in the same constituency)

For Ian Stotesbury (Lib Dem):
 Green Party of England and Wales
 More United (also endorsed Chris Ostrowski in the same constituency'')
 Renew Party

Wells 

For Tessa Munt (Lib Dem):
 Green Party of England and Wales
 More United
 Our Future Our Choice
 People's Vote
 Renew Party

West Aberdeenshire and Kincardine 

For Fergus Mutch (SNP):
 Our Future Our Choice

West Ham 

For Sara Kumar (Conservative):
 Michail Antonio, footballer

Westminster North 

For Karen Buck (Labour):
 More United

Westmorland and Lonsdale 

For Tim Farron (Lib Dem):
 Compass
 Green Party of England and Wales
 People's Vote
 Renew Party

Wimbledon 

For Stephen Hammond (Conserviative):
 More United

For Paul Kohler (Lib Dem):
 Green Party of England and Wales
 Our Future Our Choice
 Renew Party
 People's Vote

Winchester 

For Paula Ferguson (Lib Dem):
 Green Party of England and Wales
 More United
 Our Future Our Choice
 People's Vote
 Renew Party
 Alastair Campbell, journalist, broadcaster, author and former Labour political aide
 Will Hutton, political economist

Wirral South 

For Alison McGovern (Labour):
 More United

Wirral West 

For Margaret Greenwood (Labour):
 People's Vote

Witney 

For Charlotte Hoagland (Lib Dem):
 Green Party of England and Wales
 Renew Party

Wokingham 

For Phillip Lee (Lib Dem):
 Compass
 More United
 Our Future Our Choice
 People's Vote
 Alastair Campbell, journalist, broadcaster, author and former Labour political aide
 Kenneth Clarke, former Conservative and independent MP
 Michael Heseltine, former Conservative MP and deputy prime minister
 Will Hutton, political economist
 Clive Tyldesley, sport commentator

For John Redwood (Conservative):
 Leave.EU

Wolverhampton North East 

For Emma Reynolds (Labour):
 More United

Wolverhampton South East 

For Pat McFadden (Labour):
 Alastair Campbell, journalist, broadcaster, author and former Labour political aide
 Ross Kemp, actor, author and journalist

Wolverhampton South West 

For Eleanor Smith (Labour):
 People's Vote

Worcester 

For Lynn Denham (Labour):
 More United

Workington 

For Sue Hayman (Labour):
 Compass
 People's Vote

Wrexham 

For Mary Wimbury (Labour):
 Compass
 People's Vote

Y

Ynys Môn 

For Aled Dafydd (PC):
 Green Party of England and Wales
 Liberal Democrats
 More United
 People's Vote
 Renew Party

York Outer 

For Keith Aspden (Lib Dem):
 Green Party of England and Wales
 Renew Party

See also
 Newspaper endorsements in the 2010 United Kingdom general election
 2010 United Kingdom general election (endorsements)
 Endorsements in the 2015 United Kingdom general election
 Endorsements in the 2017 United Kingdom general election

Notes

References 

2019 United Kingdom general election
United Kingdom 2019 endorsements
2019 General election